Hydra was a Russian language dark web marketplace that facilitated trafficking of illegal drugs as well as financial services including cryptocurrency tumbling for money laundering and exchange services between cryptocurrency and Russian rubles, also sale of documents. On April 5, 2022, American and German federal government law enforcement agencies announced the seizure of the website's Germany-based servers and cryptocurrency assets. Before its closure, it had been the longest-running dark web marketplace. The United States Department of Justice has indicted one Russian man for his role in running the servers for the website.

Group of admins/managers running Hydra market were not discovered or arrested.

At the time of server takedown it had 17 million registered customers.

Financial services
Unique among dark net marketplaces, Hydra provided various criminal financial services.

References

External links
BKA announcement of shutdown
U.S. Treasury sanction press release
Hydra Market New Website

Defunct Tor hidden services
Defunct darknet markets